Balucta Creek is a stream in the U.S. state of Mississippi. It is a tributary to the Pearl River.

Balucta is a name derived from the Choctaw language meaning "round". A variant spelling is "Bibalucta Creek".

References

Rivers of Mississippi
Rivers of Leake County, Mississippi
Rivers of Scott County, Mississippi
Tributaries of the Pearl River (Mississippi–Louisiana)
Mississippi placenames of Native American origin